İpek Soylu and Xu Shilin were the defending champions, but both players chose not to participate.

Anastasiya Komardina and Nadia Podoroska won the title, defeating Quirine Lemoine and Eva Wacanno in the final, 7–6(7–3), 6–3.

Seeds

Draw

References
Main Draw

Torneo Internazionale Femminile Antico Tiro a Volo - Doubles